Trimmatom nanus, the midget dwarfgoby, is a species of marine goby native to the Indian Ocean and the western Pacific Ocean. This species can reach a length of  SL.

T. nanus was until 2004 the smallest known fish and vertebrate.  The recent discovery of Schindleria brevipinguis (called the stout infantfish) relegated it to second place. Later, the discovery of Paedocypris progenetica dropped T. nanus to third place. The record for the smallest known vertebrate being held by the frog Paedophryne amauensis, formally described in January 2012.

References

External links
What is the second smallest species of fish? - Australian Museum 

Gobiinae
Fish described in 1981